This is a discography of American soul band The Commodores. The Commodores released 15 studio albums and 39 singles spanning three decades from 1974 to 1993.
 
The band reached the top of the Billboard charts twice with their international smash hit singles "Three Times a Lady" and "Still". They also topped the US R&B singles chart on seven occasions. The Commodores also reached the top 10 no fewer than five times in the US with hit albums Commodores, Commodores Live!, Natural High, Midnight Magic and Heroes.

Albums

Studio albums

Compilation albums
 There are many compilation albums by Commodores. This is a selected list of albums that charted.

Live albums

Singles

A "Brick House" and "Sweet Love" were released in the UK as a double A-side single.

References

External links
 Official Commodores website
 Lionel Richie interview by Pete Lewis, 'Blues & Soul' 03/2009
 'The Commodores' Vocal Group Hall of Fame Page

Discographies of American artists
Discography
Funk music discographies